is a Buddhist temple located in the city of Mobara in Chiba Prefecture. Nyoirin-ji is a Nichiren-sect temple noted for its ancient ginkgo tree. The temple is also near the remains of the Tonoyatsu Castle.

History 
Nyoirin-ji was built approximately 1,000 years ago by a Shingon priest. In 1470 the temple was transferred to the Kempon Hokke-shū sect of Nichiren Buddhism by Sadataka Sakai (1435 - 15220) of the Sakai clan, lord of nearby Kazusa Castle. The Hondō of Nyoirin-ji was constructed in 1711 after the previous structure was destroyed by fire.

Transportation 
Nyoirin-ji is located in the Kōzeki District of Mobara. It is accessible by bus from Mobara Station on the JR East Sotobō Line.

External links
 如意輪寺 (Home site of Nyoirin-ji)

References 

 

Religious organizations established in the 11th century
Buddhist temples in Chiba Prefecture
Nichiren-shū temples
Mobara